Younousse is both a given name and a surname. Notable people with the name include:

 Younousse Sankharé (born 1989), Senegalese footballer
 Younousse Sèye (born 1940), Senegalese artist and actress
 Cherif Younousse (born 1995), Qatari volleyball player